Bredin Prat is a French law firm of about 180 lawyers, 45 of whom are partners and 14 are counsels. Founded in 1966, it is one of the largest law firms in Europe. It has offices in Paris and Brussels. Bredin Prat maintains partnerships with BonelliErede (Italy), Cravath, Swaine & Moore (United States),  Hengeler Mueller (Germany), Slaughter and May (United Kingdom), De Brauw Blackstone Westbroek (the Netherlands), and Uría Menéndez (Spain).

Recognition 
 The Legal 500 ranks Bredin Prat as top-tier in France for M&A, Commercial litigation, White-collar crime, Tax, Insolvency, EU competition and distribution and Employment.
 Chambers & Partners ranks Bredin Prat as Band 1 in France for Corporate/M&A, EU/competition, Litigation, Tax and Restructuring/Insolvency.

References

External links 
Official website (English)

Law firms of France
Law firms established in 1965
1965 establishments in France